Francis Michael Roache (August 3, 1936 – December 17, 2018) was an American law enforcement officer and politician who served as the Boston Police Commissioner from 1985 to 1993. He was also a member of the Boston City Council from 1996 to 2002 and was Suffolk County Register of Deeds from 2002 to 2015.

Early life and education
Roache was born in South Boston, and was a 1954 graduate of South Boston High School. He then served in the United States Marine Corps until 1959, and worked for Sears Roebuck in The Fenway neighborhood of Boston for 10 years, while attending Boston State College.

Career

Law enforcement
Roache joined the Boston Police Department (BPD) in 1968. On February 1, 1985, as a lieutenant who headed the BPD's Community Disorders Unit, Roache was appointed acting Police Commissioner. On March 13, he was sworn in as permanent Commissioner by his lifelong friend, Mayor of Boston Raymond Flynn.

During his tenure as Commissioner, Roache instituted mandatory drug testing for BPD employees and won praise for his efforts to root out corruption in the department.

Roache was Commissioner during the Charles Stuart case. The police's mishandling of the case caused African-American leaders to call for Roache's resignation. In December 1990, the Massachusetts Attorney General's office released a report which detailed a variety of civil rights violations committed by the BPD. Violations described in the report included random frisking of minority youth and coercing witnesses to testify in the Stuart case.

After several shootings of unarmed victims by police, alleged mismanagement in the Internal Affairs Department, and a report issued by United States Attorney Wayne Budd detailing allegations of police misconduct, Mayor Flynn was pressured to fire Roache. Flynn refused to fire Roache, which caused critics of the police department to claim that Roache's friendship with the Mayor was the reason he was still Commissioner. During the 1991 mayoral election, candidate Edward J. Doherty promised that if elected, he would fire Roache. Flynn appointed a commission led by Boston attorney James D. St. Clair to investigate the BPD. The commission recommended that Flynn fire Roache. On June 24, 1993, Roache announced his resignation, effective June 30.

Politics
After his resignation, Roache became a candidate for Mayor of Boston in the 1993 election to succeed Ray Flynn, who had resigned to become United States Ambassador to the Holy See. Roache finished in seventh place in the preliminary election with 3.01% of the vote.

Roache was elected to the Boston City Council in November 1995 as an at-large councilor. He was reelected in 1997, 1999, and 2001. In 2002, he left the City Council to become Suffolk County Registrar of Deeds, a position he held until his resignation on December 31, 2015.

Personal life
Roache and his wife, Barbara (née Campers), raised five children: Barbara, Donna, Paula, Michael, and Lori. They resided in Quincy, Massachusetts, and later the Dorchester neighborhood of Boston. He was a practicing Roman Catholic, often attending mass daily. Roache died on December 17, 2018, at the age of 82.

References

Further reading

External links

 Roache election results at ourcampaigns.com
 

1936 births
2018 deaths
Boston City Council members
Commissioners of the Boston Police Department
Massachusetts Democrats
Register of deeds in Suffolk County, Massachusetts
Military personnel from Massachusetts
Boston State College alumni